Amyderýa Nature Reserve is a nature reserve (zapovednik) of north-eastern Turkmenistan.

Established in 1982 to protect part of the Amu Darya River, it is located in the north-east of Lebap Province and covers an area of 495 km2.

It also incorporates one sanctuary:
 Kelif Sanctuary - established in 1970.

References
National Program for the Protection of the Environment, Ashgabat, 2002, pp. 149–151

External links
 Amudarya State Nature Reserve on Nature Protection

Nature reserves in Turkmenistan
Protected areas established in 1982
World Heritage Tentative List
1982 establishments in Turkmenistan